The K7023/7024 Harbin-Suifenhe Through Train is Chinese railway running between Harbin to Suifenhe express passenger trains by the Harbin Railway Bureau, Harbin passenger segment responsible for passenger transport task, Habin originating on the Suifenhe train. 25G Type Passenger trains running along the Binsui Railway across Heilongjiang provinces, the entire 557 km. Harbin East Railway Station to Suifenhe Railway Station running 10 hours and 5 minutes, use trips for K7023; Suifenhe Railway Station to Harbin Railway Station to run 9 hours and 24 minutes, use trips for K7024.

References 

Passenger rail transport in China
Rail transport in Heilongjiang